Mtoni, Dar Es Salaam is an administrative ward in the Temeke District of the Dar es Salaam Region of Tanzania. In 2016 the Tanzania National Bureau of Statistics report there were 74,355 people in the ward, from 59,378 in 2012.

References

Temeke District
Wards of Dar es Salaam Region